The following is a list of Registered Historic Places in Livingston County, Michigan.



|}

See also

 List of Michigan State Historic Sites in Livingston County, Michigan
 List of National Historic Landmarks in Michigan
 National Register of Historic Places listings in Michigan
 Listings in neighboring counties: Genesee, Ingham, Jackson, Oakland, Shiawassee, Washtenaw

References

Livingston County
Livingston County, Michigan
Tourist attractions in Metro Detroit
Buildings and structures in Livingston County, Michigan
Tourist attractions in Livingston County, Michigan